Anastasia Ivanovna Filatova (4 February 1920 – 21 October 2001) was the Russian wife of the Mongolian leader Yumjaagiin Tsedenbal. She was often considered to be the de facto co-ruler of the Mongolian People's Republic.

Early life
Filatova was born in Sapozhok in the Ryazan oblast into a family of 5. Soon after leaving school, she moved to Moscow, where she became a Komsomol organizer within the Ministry of Trade. In 1941, she had a fiancé, who served in the Red Army at the front. After they separated in 1943, she met Tsedenbal while he was visiting.

First Lady
In Mongolia, she was first received with caution as many considered her to be a kind of Soviet overseer, keeping an eye on Mongolian politicians. Her marriage to the leader of Mongolia was in itself considered a conduit of the influence of Nikolai Vazhnov (Soviet ambassador) and with the blessing of the Premier Khorloogiin Choibalsan.

Keeping a low profile in the 1950s and the 1960s, Filatova aspired to a political role of her own in her later years. She relied on the authority of her husband to subtly influence the Mongolian political landscape. She also built up connections with officials such as Vyacheslav Molotov (who served as ambassador to the MPR at this time) and relied on the influence of Soviet leader Leonid Brezhnev whom she regularly "begged" for funds for a Palace of Pioneers and Young Technicians, pioneer camps, swimming pools and a Children's Fund.

Filatova attempted to impose Russian culture and language on the Mongolians in 1970s. The First Lady's Fund became one of the main institutions of the country.

Later life and death
Filatova lived in Moscow with Tsedenbal after he fell from power and after he died in 1991. When she arrived in Ulaanbaatar from Moscow to attend Tsedenbal's funeral, the Mongolian prosecutor's office attempted to interrogate her upon arrival. During her last years, she lived in poverty and was often forced to sell her things in order make ends meet. Moreover, her eldest son Vladislav died unexpectedly when Anastasia was in the hospital in 1999. She died there on 21 October 2001, outliving her husband by 10 years.  She was buried at the Vagankovo Cemetery in Moscow. 

Tsedenbal and Filatova were survived by two children Vladislav, and Zorig.

Legacy
The Wedding Palace in Ulaanbaatar and the Ulaanbaatar Hotel was allegedly built on her initiative. The Nairamdal International Children's Center, located on the Bayangol Valley 30 km from Ulaanbaatar, was built in 1970s, which is the brainchild of Filatova. The center aimed to host international summer youth exchange programs with both Eastern bloc and Western countries. A statue of Filatova is erected in front of the center.

Sources
Shaken Nadirov, 1984 god (Moscow: Vostochnaya Literatura, 1995)
Sergey Radchenko, "Mongolian Politics in the Shadow of the Cold War: The 1964 Coup Attempt and the Sino-Soviet Split", Journal of Cold War Studies, Vol. 8 (No. 1).

References

2001 deaths
1920 births
People from Sapozhkovsky District
Soviet emigrants to Mongolia
20th-century Mongolian women politicians
20th-century Mongolian politicians
Burials at Vagankovo Cemetery